This is a list of U.S. states, territories and the District of Columbia by income. Data is given according to the 2019 American Community Survey (ACS) 1-Year Estimates, except for the American Samoa, Guam, the Northern Mariana Islands and the U.S. Virgin Islands, for which the data comes from 2010, as ACS does not operate in these areas.

States and territories ranked by median household income

Data given in current dollars. Note that tables do not reflect the margin of error in the values.

States and territories ranked by per capita income
Data for the American Samoa, Guam, the Northern Mariana Islands and the U.S. Virgin Islands is given as of 2010 (source: American FactFinder). Resident population given as of the 2020 United States Census.

See also
List of countries by average wage
List of U.S. states by median wage
Highest-income counties in the United States
Personal income in the United States
Household income in the United States
List of lowest-income places in the United States
Thank God for Mississippi

Notes

References

External links
 HUD income breakout by state low/very low/extremely low income

Income
States by income

Income
United states, Income